Mississippi Highway 388 (MS 388) is a state highway in eastern Mississippi. The route starts at the intersection of U.S. Route 45 Alternate (US 45 Alt.) and MS 852 in Brooksville, and it travels east to US 45 soon after. The route intersects MS 792 near Cliftonville, and it ends at Alabama State Route 86 (SR 86) at the Alabama–Mississippi state line. MS 388 was designated around 1957, from US 45 to a point west of the state line. The route was extended to Bigbee Valley and to the state line by 1974 and 1990, respectively.

Route description

All of MS 388 is located eastern in Noxubee County. The route is legally defined in Mississippi Code § 65-3-3, and all of it is maintained by the Mississippi Department of Transportation (MDOT), as part of the Mississippi State Highway System.

The route starts at the intersection of US 45 Alt. and MS 852 in Brooksville, and it travels east to US 45. The road leaves the city limits of Brooksville east of the intersection, and it travels south-southeast to Pilgrims Rest Road, where it turns east towards Deerbrook. The road crosses over Bogue Chitto and passes through Deerbrook. West of Cliftonville, MS 388 intersects the southern terminus of MS 792. Continuing through rural Noxubee County, the route turns northeast at Stevenson Road. At Togo Road, MS 388 turns eastward. After turning northeast at Fox Chase Road west of Bigbee Valley, the road enters into a forest and turns southeast at Clayton Road. At the Alabama–Mississippi state line, MS 388 ends and SR 86 continues east to Pickensville.

History
By 1957, MS 388 was designated along an asphalt road from US 45 east of Brooksville to a gravel road leading to the Alabama–Mississippi state line. The western terminus was moved to the northeast of Brooksville one year later. By 1963, the gravel road east of the eastern terminus in Cliftonville was transferred from state maintenance to county maintenance. MS 388 was extended eastwards to Bigbee Valley by 1974. The route was widened and built up from Brooksville to Bigbee Valley in 1986, to improve access to a Weyerhaeuser paper mill. Improvements to the route east of Bigbee Valley were not completed, as it was owned by Noxubee County, and MDOT could not take ownership until the road was upgraded. This led to truck drivers taking longer routes to the mill, as their loads were above the legal limit for the route. In March 1988, a Weyerhaeuser pulp mill was approved for construction, and Noxubee County received federal funding to rebuild the route. MS 388  was extended to the state line by 1990, with all sections paved in asphalt.

Major intersections

References

External links

388
Transportation in Noxubee County, Mississippi